East Washington Street Historic District is a national historic district located at Martinsville, Morgan County, Indiana.  The district encompasses 64 contributing buildings, 1 contributing site, and 7 contributing structures in a predominantly residential section of Martinsville.  It developed between about 1869 and 1940, and includes notable examples of Queen Anne, Classical Revival, and Colonial Revival style architecture.  Located in the district is the separately listed Neely House.  Other notable buildings include the Martinsville Presbyterian Church (1881, 1900), Sweet House (c. 1905), Gum House (c. 1890), Hubbard-Gano House (c. 1915), Frank Oak Branch House (1916), and Francesconi House (c. 1910).

It was listed on the National Register of Historic Places in 1997.

References

Historic districts on the National Register of Historic Places in Indiana
Queen Anne architecture in Indiana
Neoclassical architecture in Indiana
Colonial Revival architecture in Indiana
Historic districts in Morgan County, Indiana
National Register of Historic Places in Morgan County, Indiana